Lisa De Ranieri (born 30 July 1997) is an Italian professional racing cyclist. She signed to ride for the UCI Women's Team  for the 2019 women's road cycling season.

References

1997 births
Living people
Italian female cyclists
Place of birth missing (living people)